Mystrophorus is a genus of insects belonging to the family Dryinidae.

The species of this genus are found in Europe.

Species:
 Mystrophorus apterus Ponomarenko, 2000 
 Mystrophorus formicaeformis Ruthe, 1859

References

Dryinidae
Hymenoptera genera